Portrait is the fifth album by American pop group The 5th Dimension, released in 1970 (see 1970 in music).  This is the group's first album for Bell Records, having switched from the Soul City Records label.  The cover features an impressionistic portrait by famous artist LeRoy Neiman.

The album languished in the mid-60s on the Billboard Top 200 Album Charts after the release of its first three singles, none of which entered the Top 20 of the American pop music charts. Bell Records, hoping to see a return on the investment they made by signing The 5th Dimension after the group's contract at Soul City Records ended, made a fourth and final attempt at a hit – a relatively uncommon practice at the time – with the release of Burt Bacharach and Hal David's "One Less Bell to Answer".  The single rose all the way to #2 by Christmas 1970, becoming one of the group's greatest hits of all time.  As a result, Portrait began climbing the charts once again, eventually peaking at #20.   The single features Marilyn McCoo on lead vocal, and ushers in The 5th Dimension's transition from pop to adult contemporary artists.  McCoo from this point became the primary vocalist for the group's subsequent chart hits, including "Last Night (I Didn't Get to Sleep at All)", "Love's Lines, Angles and Rhymes", "Never My Love", "If I Could Reach You", "House for Sale", "Everything's Been Changed" and "Flashback". This became a source of friction for the group as time went on, and was in part responsible for McCoo and husband Billy Davis Jr. leaving the group after the release of Earthbound in 1975.

Track listing
Side one
"Puppet Man" (Howard Greenfield, Neil Sedaka) – 3:00
"One Less Bell to Answer" (Burt Bacharach, Hal David) – 3:31
"Feelin' Alright?" (Dave Mason) – 4:28
"This Is Your Life" (Jimmy Webb) – 4:13
"A Love Like Ours" (Bob Alcivar, Lamonte McLemore) – 2:39

Side two
"Save the Country" (Laura Nyro) – 2:39
"Medley" – 10:12
"The Declaration" (words are from the U.S. Declaration of Independence, the only known setting of it to music) (Julius Johnsen, René DeKnight) from the play "Bread, Beans & Things" 
"A Change Is Gonna Come" (Sam Cooke)
"People Gotta Be Free" (Eddie Brigati, Felix Cavaliere)
"Dimension 5ive" (Bob Alcivar) – 4:15

Bonus track on CD
"On the Beach (In the Summertime)" (Landy McNeil) – 3:28

Personnel
Billy Davis Jr. - lead vocals (tracks 3, 7), background vocals 
Florence LaRue - lead vocals (tracks 1, 4), background vocals 
Marilyn McCoo - lead vocals (tracks 1–2), background vocals
Lamonte McLemore - lead vocals (track 5), background vocals
Ron Townson - lead vocals (track 9), background vocals

Additional personnel
Michael Anthony - electric guitar
Mike Deasy - electric guitar
Dennis Budimir - rhythm guitar
Tommy Tedesco - rhythm guitar
Fred Tackett - finger pickin' guitar 
Joe Osborn - bass
Hal Blaine - drums, percussion
Larry Bunker - congas, mallets, percussion, drums
Gary Coleman - mallets, percussion
Larry Knechtel - piano, organ, tack piano
Jimmy Rowles - piano
Gary Illingworth - electric piano
Bob Alcivar - arranger

Production
As mentioned on the liner notes of the album, this was one of the first albums to be recorded on a 16-track recorder, and was recorded at the Wally Heider Studios in Hollywood. The sketches of the vocal recording sessions included in the album cover art are dated January 13 and January 14, 1970.

Producer: Bones Howe
Engineer: Bones Howe
Mastering: Elliot Federman
Digital transfers: Mike Hartry
Reissue producer: Rob Santos
Production coordination: Jeremy Holiday
Production assistant: Bones Howe, Ann McClelland, Tom Tierney, Russ Wapensky
Product manager: Mandana Eidgah
Project coordinator: Arlessa Barnes, Glenn Delgado, Christina DeSimone, Karyn Friedland, Felicia Gearhart, Laura Gregory, Robin Manning, Brooke Nochomson, Ed Osborne, Larry Parra, Dana Renert, Bill Stafford, Steve Strauss
Archivist: Joanne Feltman, Glenn Korman
Research: Joel Whitburn
Assistants: Larry Cox, Johnny Golden, Rik Pekkonen
Arranger: Bob Alcivar, Bill Holman, Bones Howe
Art direction: Beverly Weinstein
Reissue art director: Mathieu Bitton
Design: Mathieu Bitton
Cover painting: LeRoy Neiman
Liner notes: Mike Ragogna

Charts
Album 

Singles

References

The 5th Dimension albums
1970 albums
Albums produced by Bones Howe
Bell Records albums